Followap was the leading provider and pioneer of mobile Messenger - Instant Messaging and Presence solutions to the mobile industry. It was founded in 1999 and managed by Dan Volach and Ben Volach when mobile Internet was just born. By the time it was acquired, it had over 20 mobile operators many of them tier-ones, serving a combined user base of over 200 million subscribers. The company's headquarters were in London, UK.

Followap’s products enabled operators to establish advanced, interoperable mobile Messenger and presence-enhanced services, which were key for next-generation networks. Followap held numerous patents and was actively contributing to industry standardization efforts in forums including OMA, XMPP, IETF, 3GPP and the GSM Association. Followap cooperated with device manufacturers including Samsung, Nokia and LG. 

Followap has launched the first commercial mobile Messenger service in the year 2000 in partnership with Eircell, Ireland's largest mobile network. Other key customers of Followap included the Vodafone Group, Hutchison 3G Group, BT Group, Turkcell, Telecom Italia, Wind and Vimpelcom.

The mobile Messenger which Followap pioneered evolved into extremely popular services following the introduction of the iPhone and App stores for wide-market distribution. These include Whatsapp, Line, QQ, WeChat and KakaoTalk. 

The company was acquired by NeuStar for approx. $140M in cash, in November 2006. Investors included Sequoia Capital and Carmel Ventures.

References

Telecommunications companies of the United Kingdom
2006 mergers and acquisitions